The 1913 Washington Senators won 90 games, lost 64, and finished in second place in the American League. They were managed by Clark Griffith and played home games at National Park.

Regular season 
This was a very good season for a team that was considered perennial losers. The nucleus was still ace pitcher Walter Johnson. He won each category of the pitching triple crown by wide margins and was voted league MVP, in perhaps his best season. Clyde Milan, Johnson's best friend, set a modern-day stolen base record, with 75. The offense was led by future Black Sox ringleader Chick Gandil, who hit .318 and drove in a team-leading 72 runs. Eccentric Germany Schaefer hit .320 in limited action.

Season standings

Record vs. opponents

Roster

Player stats

Batting

Starters by position 
Note: Pos = Position; G = Games played; AB = At bats; H = Hits; Avg. = Batting average; HR = Home runs; RBI = Runs batted in

Other batters 
Note: G = Games played; AB = At bats; H = Hits; Avg. = Batting average; HR = Home runs; RBI = Runs batted in

Pitching

Starting pitchers 
Note: G = Games pitched; IP = Innings pitched; W = Wins; L = Losses; ERA = Earned run average; SO = Strikeouts

Other pitchers 
Note: G = Games pitched; IP = Innings pitched; W = Wins; L = Losses; ERA = Earned run average; SO = Strikeouts

Relief pitchers 
Note: G = Games pitched; W = Wins; L = Losses; SV = Saves; ERA = Earned run average; SO = Strikeouts

Awards and honors

League awards 
Walter Johnson
 AL Most Valuable Player

League top five finishers 
Walter Johnson
 MLB leader in wins (36)
 MLB leader in ERA (1.14)
 MLB leader in strikeouts (243)
 MLB leader in shutouts (11)

Clyde Milan
 MLB leader in stolen bases (75)

Danny Moeller
 #2 in AL in stolen bases (62)

References 
1913 Washington Senators at Baseball-Reference
1913 Washington Senators at Baseball Almanac

Minnesota Twins seasons
Washington Senators season
Washington